Michael Vivian Posner  (25 August 1931 – 14 February 2006) was a University of Cambridge economics lecturer turned government adviser, who later worked to safeguard social science research in the United Kingdom.

Biography 
Posner was born to Jack and Lena Posner. His father, originally a cabinet-maker, had immigrated from Russia to escape pogroms against the Jewish community. Posner’s maternal grandparents had also fled European persecution. He grew up in Ilford. After World War II the family settled in Croydon, where Posner attended Whitgift School. He then went to Balliol College, Oxford.

In 1953, Posner married linguist Rebecca Reynolds. Together they had two children: a son, Christopher, and a daughter, Barbara.

Works 
 Posner, Michael V. (1961), International Trade and Technical Change, in: Oxford Economic Papers, Jahrgang 13, Nr. 3, 1961, S. 323–341.

External links 
 Times Obituary

References

1931 births
2006 deaths
Academics of the University of Cambridge
British economists
Commanders of the Order of the British Empire
People educated at Whitgift School